Tory Terrell Humphrey (born January 20, 1983 in Saginaw, Michigan) is an American football tight end who played six seasons in the National Football League. He was signed by the Indianapolis Colts as an undrafted free agent in 2005. He played college football at Central Michigan.

Humphrey has also played for the Green Bay Packers and New Orleans Saints.

Professional career

Indianapolis Colts
After going undrafted in the 2005 NFL Draft, Humphrey signed with the Indianapolis Colts as an undrafted free agent on April 29. He was waived by the team on June 9.

Green Bay Packers
Humphrey signed his one-year tender offer as an exclusive-rights free agent on March 19, 2008. As a restricted free agent in the 2009 offseason, he re-signed with the Packers on April 6.

Humphrey suffered a broken arm during training camp on August 7, 2009 after being hit by safety Aaron Rouse. Humphrey underwent successful surgery following the injury, but was ruled out by head coach Mike McCarthy for the rest of the 2009 season. He was waived/injured on August 13 and subsequently reverted to injured reserve. He was released with an injury settlement on August 20.

New Orleans Saints
Humphrey signed with the New Orleans Saints on December 21, 2009. He was waived five days later on December 26 when the team promoted cornerback Greg Fassitt from the practice squad. Humphrey was re-signed on December 29 as the team waived safety Herana-Daze Jones.  He caught one pass in the Saints' final regular season game, but was inactive for their playoff run that ended with their win in Super Bowl XLIV. He was released as a final cut in 2011, but re-signed with the Saints on October 26, 2011.

Oakland Raiders
Humphrey signed with the Oakland Raiders during their off-season training program on June 12, 2012.

References

External links
Green Bay Packers bio

1983 births
Living people
Sportspeople from Saginaw, Michigan
Players of American football from Michigan
American football tight ends
American football fullbacks
Central Michigan Chippewas football players
Indianapolis Colts players
Green Bay Packers players
Amsterdam Admirals players
New Orleans Saints players
Oakland Raiders players